MNJ may refer to:

Niger Movement for Justice, a rebel group in Niger
Munji language, a language of Afghanistan
Middletown and New Jersey Railroad, reporting mark